The Great Britain women's national wheelchair basketball team is the women's wheelchair basketball team that represents Great Britain in international competitions. It is governed by the Great Britain Wheelchair Basketball Association.

History 

In 2018, Great Britain won silver at the 2018 World Championships in Hamburg.

At the 2019 Women’s Wheelchair Basketball European Championships in Rotterdam, Great Britain secured qualification to the 2020 Summer Paralympics in Tokyo. Going into the tournament, Great Britain were the reigning Worlds silver medalists as well as the third-place team in six consecutive European Championships. Great Britain lost 65-52 to the Netherlands in a rematch of the 2018 World Championships gold medal game.

Paralympic games

IWBF World Championships

Roster

See also 

 Great Britain men's national wheelchair basketball team
 Great Britain women's national basketball team

References

External links 
 British Wheelchair Basketball

National women's wheelchair basketball teams
Wheelchair basketball
W